Foster Moverley McRae, commonly known as Peter McRae (12 February 1916 – 25 February 1944) was an English cricketer who played 25 first-class matches for Somerset County Cricket Club between 1936 and 1939.  He died during the Second World War, when , which he served on as Surgeon Lieutenant, was torpedoed and sunk in the Barents Sea.

Military career
During the Second World War, McRae served in the Royal Naval Volunteer Reserve.

In 1941–1945 The Arctic Lookout, Noel Simon recounts a story he was told of McRae's actions after the sinking:

Having managed to climb onto one of the few Carley floats to have come through the sinking, he set about hauling the others aboard. The float soon became overcrowded.  Remarking almost casually; "There's not enough room for us all" the doctor slipped over the side into the sea and was never seen again.

He is commemorated on the Portsmouth Naval Memorial.

References

External links
 
 

1916 births
1944 deaths
Cricketers from Buenos Aires
English cricketers
Somerset cricketers
Royal Navy personnel killed in World War II
Argentine cricketers
Royal Navy officers of World War II
Deaths due to shipwreck at sea
Royal Naval Volunteer Reserve personnel of World War II
British expatriates in Argentina